Lydia Woodward is an American television writer and producer. She has worked as both a writer and producer on the television series ER. She signed a deal with the Warners in 2001.

Positions held
Pan Am (Co-Executive Producer, Writer)
The Riches (Consulting Producer, Writer)
Presidio Med (Co-Creator, Executive Producer, Writer)
Citizen Baines (Creator, Executive Producer, Writer)
ER (Executive Producer, Supervising Producer, Consulting Producer, Writer)
Keys (Supervising Producer)
Angel Street (Supervising Producer, Writer)
China Beach (Executive Script Consultant, Producer, Writer)
St. Elsewhere (Story Editor, Writer)
Hooperman (Writer)
Slap Maxwell (Writer)
Miss Lonelyhearts (Producer)

Awards and nominations
Woodward has won one Emmy Award and been nominated for 7 other Primetime Emmy Award for Outstanding Drama Series.

References

External links

American television writers
American television producers
American women television producers
Emmy Award winners
Living people
American women television writers
Place of birth missing (living people)
Year of birth missing (living people)
20th-century American screenwriters
20th-century American women writers
21st-century American screenwriters
21st-century American women writers